Anti-glomerular basement membrane antibody (anti-GBM Ab) is an antibody which is found in Goodpasture's syndrome but not found in microscopic polyangiitis.

Some sources consider "anti-GBM disease" and "Goodpasture disease" to be synonymous terms describing histological presentation, reserving the term "Goodpasture syndrome" for clinical presentation.

See also
 glomerular basement membrane

References

External links
 

Autoantibodies